

I
 IAIS - Iowa Interstate Railroad
 IALU - Japan Line, Ltd
 IANR - Iowa Northern Railway
 IAPX - Liquid Air, Inc.; Air Liquide America Corporation
 IASZ - Iowa Interstate Railroad
 IAT  - Iowa Terminal Railroad
 IATR - Iowa Traction Railroad
 IBCX - Indiana Boxcar Corporation
 IBNU - Interpool Container Pty, Ltd.
 IBPX - Merchants Despatch Transportation Corp.; IBP, Inc.; Trinity Industries Leasing Co. (Lessee: IBP, Inc.; Tyson Foods, Inc.)
 IBT  - International Bridge and Terminal Company
 IBYU - Tuscola and Saginaw Bay Railway
 IC   - Illinois Central Railroad; Illinois Central Gulf Railroad; Canadian National Railway
 ICCU - ICCU Containers, Inc.
 ICCX - International Catalyst Corporation
 ICE  - Iowa, Chicago and Eastern Railroad
 ICEU - Inter-Continental Equipment, Inc.
 ICEZ - GATX Capital Corporation
 ICG  - Illinois Central Gulf Railroad; Illinois Central Railroad; Canadian National Railway
 ICGU - Illinois Central Railroad; Canadian National Railway
 ICGZ - Illinois Central Railroad; Canadian National Railway
 ICHU - Ingetra, AG
 ICIU - Intermodal Containers, Inc.
 ICIX - ICI Americas, Inc.
 ICIZ - Intermodal Containers, Inc.
 ICLU - International Container Leasing
 ICLX - Intercoastal Leasing, Inc.
 ICLZ - International Chassis Leasing, Inc.
 ICMU - Interox America
 ICMX - Illinois Cereal Mills, Inc.
 ICOU - Japan Line, Ltd.
 ICPU - Intermodal Container Pool, Inc.
 ICPZ - Intermodal Container Pool, Inc.
 ICRK - Indian Creek Railroad
 ICRU - Ingetra, AG
 ICRX - Island Creek Coal Company; Island Creek Corporation
 ICRZ - Illinois Central Railroad; Canadian National Railway
 ICSU - Transamerica Leasing, Inc.
 ICSZ - Transamerica Leasing, Inc.; Union Pacific Railroad
 IDAC - Idaho Central Railroad; Boise Pacific Railroad
 IDAX - Industria del Alcali, SA
 IDCU - Ideal Container
 IDOX - United States Department of Energy (Idaho Operations Office)
 IDSZ - Industrial Distribution Service, Inc.
 IDTX - Illinois Department of Transportation
 IEAU - Intermodal Equipment Associates
 IELZ - Iran Express Lines
 IESX - IESX Corporation; Alliant Energy
 IFBX - Indiana Farm Bureau Cooperative Association, Inc.; GE Rail Services Corporation
 IFCX - Interstate Foods Corporation
 IFLU - Interflow
 IFOX - Industrial Fuel Oil, Inc.
 IFRX - Infinity Rail
 IFSU - Interlink Freight Systems
 IFWZ - Independent Freightway, Inc.
 IGN  - International-Great Northern
 IGPX - Industrial Steam Products
 IHAU - Ihora Chemical Industrial
 IHB  - Indiana Harbor Belt Railroad
 IHCU - 
 IHRC - Indiana Hi-Rail Corporation
 IHSX - Alberni Pacific Railway (Western Vancouver Island Heritage Society)
 IICZ - Illinois Central Railroad; Canadian National Railway
 IIIU - III Transportation
 IIIZ - III Transportation
 IILU - Independent Container Line
 IILZ - Independent Container Line
 IIRC - Indiana Interstate Railway
 IIRZ - III Transportation
 IKCU - Interpool
 IKKU - ICCU Containers, Inc.
 IKSU - Transamerica Leasing, Inc.
 ILDX - General Electric (Lighting Business Group)
 ILMU - Flow Line Transport
 ILSX - Independent Locomotive Service
 ILTU - International Liquid Transport Company, Bv
 ILW  - Illinois Western Railroad
 IMCX - International Minerals and Chemical Corporation; IMC Global Operations
 IMEX - Indiana and Michigan Electric Company
 IMFX - General American Transportation Corporation
 IMMX - Industrial Minera Mexico, SA
 IMRL - Illinois and Missouri Rail Link; Iowa, Chicago and Eastern Railroad
 IMRR - Illinois and Midland Railroad
 IMSX - IMCO Services (a division of the Halliburton Company); International Mill Service
 IMSZ - Intermodal Systems, Inc.
 IMTX - Multifoods Transportation, Inc.; AG Processing, Inc.
 IMXZ - Intermodal Express, Inc.
 IN   - Indiana Northeastern Railroad
 INCU - Intercontinental Transport, B.V.
 INCX - Inco Railway
 INCZ - Intercontinental Transport, B.V.
 INCZ - Intercontinental Transport, B.V.
 INDU - Dorothea Marine Entreprise and Management
 INDX - Indelpro, SA de CV
 INFX - Infineum USA, Ltd.
 INGX - Ingomar Packing Company; GE Rail Services Corporation
 INKU - Interpool, Ltd.
 INLX - Inland Steel Coal Company; Incoal Company
 INOH - Indiana and Ohio Railroad
 INOX - Indiana and Ohio Rail Corporation
 INPR - Idaho Northern and Pacific Railroad
 INRD - Indiana Rail Road
 INSU - Intersub Services
 INSX - Independent Salt Company
 INT  - Interstate Railroad; Norfolk Southern
 INTU - Interpool Container Pty, Ltd.
 INYU - Infinity Transportation Logistics
 INTZ - Interpool, Ltd.
 IOCR - Indiana and Ohio Central Railroad
 IOCX - Rail Enterprises, Inc.
 IOLU - Textainer Equipment Management (US), Ltd.
 IOPX - Iowa Power and Light Company; MidAmerican Energy Company
 IORY - Indiana and Ohio Railway
 IPBX - INNOPHOS, Inc
 IPCU - Independent Container Line
 IPCX - International Paper
 IPEX - Indeck Power Equipment Company
 IPLX - Illinois Power Company
 IPOX - A and R Leasing, LLP
 IPPX - Intermountain Power Agency
 IPSX - Midwest Energy Services Company; General American Marks Company
 IPWX - Interstate Power Company; Alliant Energy
 IQIX - Industria Quimica Del letmo, SA de CV
 IR   - Illinois RailNet
 IREX - IRECO, Inc.
 IRLX - Western Railroad Supply, Inc.
 IRMX - Illinois Railway Museum
 IRMZ - III Transportation
 IRN  - Conrail
 IRRC - Iowa Railroad
 IRRS - International Rail Road Systems, Inc.
 IRSZ - Interpool/Rail Services, Ltd.
 IRTX  - Inter-Rail Transport
 ISCU - I.S.C. Chemicals, Ltd.
 ISCX - ISC, Inc.
 ISG  - ISG Railways
 ISIZ - Intermodal Services, Inc.
 ISLU - Islandia, Ltd.
 ISPX - Western Company of North America
 ISR  - Iowa Southern Railroad
 ISRR - Indiana Southern Railroad
 ISSR - ISS Rail, Inc.
 ISSU - Iceland Steamship Company, Ltd.
 ISU  - Iowa Southern Utilities (Southern Industrial Railroad)
 ISW  - Indiana Southwestern Railway
 ITAU - Italian Line
 ITAX - Illinois Transit Assembly, Inc.
 ITB  - Illinois Terminal Belt
 ITC  - Illinois Terminal Railroad; Norfolk and Western Railroad; Norfolk Southern
 ITCU - Intercontainer
 ITCX - International Technologies Corporation
 ITDX - SULCOM, Inc.
 ITEU - Compagnia Italiana Investimenti Alternativi
 ITFX - Infinity Transportation
 ITGX - ITG, Inc.
 ITIU - International Transchem, Inc.
 ITIX - Intermodal Technologies, Inc.
 ITKU - Intertank, Ltd.
 ITLU - Itel Containers International Corporation
 ITLX - GE Rail Services Corporation
 ITRU - Itel Containers International Corporation
 ITSU - Iberhansaetic Transport System
 ITSZ - International Transportation Service, Inc.
 ITTX - Trailer Train Company, TTX Company
 ITXX - Tiaxcalteca de Industrias, SA de CV
 IU   - Indianapolis Union
 IVCX  - Invista S.A.R.L.
 IVLU - Ivarans Rederei, A/S
 IXEU - Interox Quimica, SA
 IXWU - Interox Chemicals, Ltd.

I